The Communauté de communes de l'Auxillois is a former communauté de communes in the Pas-de-Calais département and in the Nord-Pas-de-Calais région of France. It was created in January 1999. It was merged into the new Communauté de communes du Ternois in January 2017.

Composition 
The Communauté de communes comprised the following communes:

Auxi-le-Château 
Beauvoir-Wavans  
Boffles 
Buire-au-Bois  
Fontaine-l'Étalon  
Gennes-Ivergny 
Haravesnes 
Le Ponchel 
Nœux-lès-Auxi 
Quœux-Haut-Maînil  
Rougefay 
Tollent 
Vaulx 
Villers-l'Hôpital  
Vitz-sur-Authie (in the department of the Somme)
Willencourt

See also 
Communes of the Pas-de-Calais department
Communes of the Somme department

References 

Auxillois
Auxillois
1999 establishments in France
2017 disestablishments in France